Carabus blaptoides rugipennis is a subspecies of ground beetle in the family Carabidae that can be found in Japan and Russia. The species are gray  coloured with green pronotum.

References

blaptoides rugipennis
Beetles described in 1861